The year 1643 in music involved some significant events.

Events
Composer Johann Crüger meets hymn-writer Paul Gerhardt, resulting in a collaboration.
Johann von Rist publishes his Himmlische Lieder, later set to music by Johann Sebastian Bach.
Pierre Robert becomes master of music at Senlis Cathedral.

Publications
Marco Scacchi – Cribrum musicum

Classical music
Carlo Milanuzzi
 for two and three voices, book 2, Op. 21 (Venice: Alessandro Vincenti)
Cornelis Thymanszoon Padbrué
Eere-krans..., written for the wedding of Constantin Sohier and Catharina Koymans
 't Lof van Jubal..., Op. 3, a collection of madrigals and motets

Opera
L'Incoronazione di Poppea – Claudio Monteverdi
Egisto (opera) – Francesco Cavalli

Births
July 28 – Antonio Tarsia, composer (died 1722)
December – Johann Adam Reincken, organist and composer (died 1722)
date unknown – Marc-Antoine Charpentier, composer (died 1704)

Deaths
February 25 – Marco da Gagliano, composer (born 1582)
March 1 – Girolamo Frescobaldi, composer and organist (born 1583)
April 20 – Christoph Demantius, composer (born 1567)
May 17 – Giovanni Picchi, organist and composer (born c.1571)
November 29 – Claudio Monteverdi, composer (born 1567)
December 8 – Antoine Boësset, French court musician and composer (born 1586)
probable – Guillaume Bouzignac, French composer (born c.1587)